Plocamosaris telegraphella is a moth in the family Gelechiidae. It was described by Francis Walker in 1866. It is found in Amazonas, Brazil.

Adults are dull reddish, the forewings with a paler red costal stripe and with a silvery-white subcostal line extending along nearly half the length from the tip. There is a deep black costal line in front of the subcostal line, obliquely intersected by four little silvery-white streaks.

References

Moths described in 1866
Dichomeridinae